Lakshana, also known as Krishnendu is an Indian actress working in Malayalam and Tamil films.

Filmography

TV Serial
 Oonjal (DD Malayalam)
 Pakida Pakida Pambaram
 Hridayam Sneha Sandram [Mazhavil Manorama]

TV Shows
 Flowers Oru Kodi - Participant
 Sarigama - Participant

References

External links

Actresses from Thiruvananthapuram
Actresses in Malayalam cinema
Indian film actresses
Actresses in Tamil cinema
Living people
Year of birth missing (living people)
Actresses in Telugu cinema
Actresses in Malayalam television
21st-century Indian actresses